Mysterious Mose is a 1930 Fleischer Studios animated short released through Paramount Pictures as part of the Talkartoons series.  This film contains an early version of Betty Boop and the studio's star, Bimbo. "Mysterious Mose" is also the name of a popular song from 1930 (which is sung in the short).

Popular song 
"Mysterious Mose" was a song from early 1930, written by Walter Doyle and first recorded by Ted Weems and his Orchestra. In addition to its appearance in the short, there have been numerous recordings of the song, including Harry Reser and his Radio All-star Novelty Orchestra, Cliff Perrine and his Orchestra, Karl Radlach and his Orchestra, Rube Bloom and his Bayou Boys, and R. Crumb & His Cheap Suit Serenaders.

Synopsis
Betty is startled awake in her bed on a stormy night. She searches for the cause of the shock while she sings the song. Then, unexplainable phenomena start happening in the house. Mysterious Mose (Bimbo) appears, and sings part of the song. Bizarre cartoon creatures appear and, at first, sing and enhance Mose's "mysterious" image. Quickly, however, the antics become frightful even to Mose. The film escalates into chaos, which ends when Mose bursts, revealing him having been an automaton (full of cogs and springs) the whole time.

In popular culture
Graveyard Jamboree with Mysterious Mose is a short film made in 1998 by film makers Seamus Walsh and Mark Caballero of Screen Novelties. The film utilizes puppetry, stop motion, and silhouette animation to tell the story of an otherworldly creature preparing a celebration in a cemetery. Walsh and Caballero used the song "Mysterious Mose," recorded in 1930 by Harry Reser and his Radio All-star Novelty Orchestra.

References

External links
 
 
 Mysterious Mose at IMDB

1930s English-language films
1930s American animated films
1930 animated films
1930 comedy films
1930 short films
1930s animated short films
Betty Boop cartoons
American black-and-white films
Fleischer Studios short films
Paramount Pictures short films
Short films directed by Dave Fleischer
American comedy short films
American robot films
Animated films about robots
American animated short films
Animated films about dogs